The 1929 Preakness Stakes was the 54th running of the $62,325 Preakness Stakes horse race for three-year-old Thoroughbreds. The race took place on May 10, 1929 and was run 8 days before the Kentucky Derby. Ridden by Louis Schaefer, Dr. Freeland won the race by one length over runner-up Minotaur. The race was run on a track rated fast in a final time of 2:01 3/5.

Payout 
The 54th Preakness Stakes Payout Schedule

The full chart 
Daily Racing Form charts:

 † coupled

 Winning Breeder: Mereworth Stud; (KY)
 Times: 1/4 mile – 0:23 4/5; 1/2 mile – 48 3/5; 3/4 mile – 1:13 4/5; mile – 1:40 2/5; 1 3/16 (final) – 2:01.3/5
 Track Condition: Fast

References

External links 
 

1929
Pimlico Race Course
1929 in horse racing
1929 in American sports
1929 in sports in Maryland
Horse races in Maryland